or Fuke Zen was, according to the legend, a distinct and ephemeral derivative school of Zen Buddhism that originated as an offshoot of the Rinzai school during the nation's feudal era, lasting from the 13th century until the late 19th century. There are however no historical records to support this.

Fuke-shū traced its philosophical roots to the eccentric Zen master Puhua (J. Fuke), as well as similarities and correspondences with the early Linji school, one of the Five Houses of Chan, and previous Chan Buddhism traditions, particularly Huineng's "Sudden Enlightenment", in Tang China. The connection to the Zen master Puhua has not been established in historical records, except for a text that was published in 1795 but is most likely a made-up story in order to institutionalize the monks of the Fuke sect. 

Fuke monastics or komusō were noted for playing the shakuhachi as a form of meditation known as suizen ("blowing meditation"), an innovation from the earlier zazen ("sitting meditation") of other Zen sects. Fuke Zen was characterized in the public imagination of Japan by monks playing the shakuhachi flute while wearing a large woven basket hat or  that covered their entire head as they went on pilgrimage.

The theoretical basis of Fuke-shū was to emphasise the concept of the incommunicable aspect of enlightenment, an ideal traced to various Buddhist sects and relayed in paradoxical Zen writings such as the Laṅkāvatāra Sūtra, the Diamond Sutra and Bodhidharma's "Bloodstream sermon". Thus Fuke monks rarely chanted sutras or other Buddhist texts, but rather relied upon scores of sacred shakuhachi music called honkyoku to express and transmit awakening.

The Fuke sect has never been officially acknowledged. Only the komusō were formally acknowledged by the authorities in 1677, but this was withdrawn in 1871. Technically one can say that the komusō continues to exist (albeit in a less organized form) through the lineage of the contemporary Kyochiku Zenji Hosan Kai (KZHK) group in Kyoto—which organizes annual meetings for hundreds of shakuhachi players, Rinzai clerics, and Fuke Zen enthusiasts—and the related Myōan Society, as well as other small groups throughout Japan. KZHK and the Myōan Society operate from their base temples of Tōfuku-ji and Myōan-ji, the latter being the former headquarters of the Fuke sect. Many Rinzai monks still practice as komusō during certain celebrations in former Fuke-shū temples that have, since the 19th century, reverted to traditional Rinzai Zen. Notable temples include Kokutai-ji and Ichigatsu-ji.

At least several particular individuals in modern times have been known to pursue temporary itinerant lifestyles as komusō, for spiritual or learning purposes. Hõzan Murata, a famous shakuhachi player, maker, and dai-shihan (grandmaster), lived as a komusō for 8 months in 1974. Perhaps the most well known contemporary komusō are Kokū Nishimura—who famously carried on the tradition of dubbing shakuhachi kyotaku ("empty bell"), in reference to the legend of Puhua (Fuke)—and Watazumi Doso, known for his innovations with and revitalization of the shakuhachi repertoire, and the popularization of the hotchiku.

The Founder Puhua

 

Fuke-shū, according to some accounts, is derived from the teachings of the Chinese Zen teacher Linji Yixuan (c. 800–866), known in Japan as Rinzai Gigen. However, the Fuke school counted as its founder one of Linji's contemporaries Pǔhuà (普化), whose name is read as Fuke in Japanese. Puhua was reputedly a multi-talented monk, known for being inventive and at the same time quite strict. The notion of Puhua as founder is also supported by several references in the Record of Linji, as well as the Kyotaku Denki. (Although the latter was later confirmed as a fabrication used to further the komusōs' benefits under the Tokugawa shogunate.)

One story of Puhua particularly demonstrates his unique style of nonverbal Chan:

Many stories about Puhua that appear in the Record of Linji add to his reputation of having a rough and uncompromising manner of expressing the dharma.

There is some controversy as to the degree and nature of his musical talents, but his followers would often reflect on a certain story for inspiration: the story describes Puhua going through his hometown, ringing a bell to summon others to enlightenment. The same, for many Fuke practitioners, applied to the shakuhachi, and its mastery was seen as a path to enlightenment.

Death of Puhua
The death of Puhua is recounted in the Record of Linji. In addition to giving a special importance to Puhua's ringing bell, it is particularly striking as a story of Buddhist resurrection that equals the famous resurrection story of Bodhidharma, the Indian master who brought the Ekayāna school from India to China, which became Chan Buddhism.

Fuke lineage in Japan
Kakushin had travelled to China for six years and studied with the famous Chinese Chan master Wumen (無門) of the Linji lineage. Kakushin became a disciple of Chôsan, a 17th generation teacher of the Fuke sect of China.

Although it no longer exists as a religious organization, during the feudal period, Fuke Zen's following was quite extensive.  Its members could be easily recognized by their practice of playing the shakuhachi flute, which was considered a form of meditation, termed suizen (吹禪).  These musician-monks were known at first as komosō (薦僧; literally "straw-mat monks") and, by the mid-17th century, as komusō (虚無僧; literally "emptiness monk").

Fuke Zen in general stressed pilgrimage, and its adherents were mostly lay-practitioners rather than clergymen. During the Edo period (1603–1867), many rōnin became incorporated into the sect, and due to the temperaments of these former samurai, the sect gained the reputation of harbouring troublemakers. Members of the Fuke sect were also given permission by the Bakufu government of the time to travel freely throughout the country, a significant dispensation considering the severe travel restrictions of the time. In reality, some of the Fuke monks were spies for the Bakufu government, a practice which helped seal the sect's demise when the government itself fell.

Development and demise

Fuke, which had initially been a loose affiliation of monks and lay pilgrims, solidified as a sect around 1700.  However, the sect died out in 1871 following the Meiji Restoration. The new government promulgated a grand council proclamation banning the practice of Fuke Zen and playing the shakuhachi for religious reasons. This is because, as described above, in practice many of the Fuke were spies and informers for the government. Practice of the shakuhachi was banned entirely for four years by the Meiji government, after which it was decreed that secular playing was permitted. From that time onward the playing of original Fuke pieces, honkyoku, made a very slow recovery. The recovery is continuing to this day.

See also 

 Puhua
 Shakuhachi
 Honkyoku
 Hotchiku
 Suizen
 Zen
 Rinzai
 Ōbaku

Notes

References
Ferguson, Andy. Zen's Chinese Heritage: The Masters and Their Teachings. Wisdom Publications, Boston, 2000. .
Watson, Burton; tr. The Zen Teachings of Master Lin-Chi: A Translation of the Lin-chi lu. New York: Columbia University Press, 1999. .
Schloegl, Irmgard; tr. The Zen Teaching of Rinzai. Shambhala Publications, Inc., Berkeley, 1976. .
Shin Meikai kokugo jiten (新明解国語辞典), Sanseido Co., Ltd., Tokyo 1974

Further reading
 Deeg, Max (2007), Komuso and “Shakuhachi-Zen”: From Historical Legitimation to the Spiritualisation of a Buddhist Denomination in the Edo Period, Japanese Religion 32 (1-2), 7-38

External links

The Zen Teaching of Rinzai (a.k.a. The Record of Rinzai) PDF Text
Taisho Tripitaka Vol. 47, No. 1985 The Chinese Buddhist Electronic Text Association online Chinese character text of The Record of Linji (臨濟録 Linji Lu)
The Kyotaku Denki 

Rinzai school
 
Japanese traditional music
Defunct schools of Buddhism in Japan
Buddhism in the Edo period